The Music Room or Music Room or variation, may refer to:

Entertainment
 Jalsaghar, a 1958 film also known as Jalsaghar: The Music Room
 The Music Room, a 2009 novel by William Fiennes (author)
 The Music Room, a 1990 novel by Dennis McFarland
 The Music Room (album), 2014 album by Sonu Nigam and Bickram Ghosh
 Music Room (TV series), British music TV show
 "The Music Room" (short story), a 2016 short story by Stephen King

Rooms
 Music Room (exhibitory), a display chamber at the tourist attraction American Treasure Tour
 Music Room (room), a chamber designed by James Wyatt in 1788 in Exminster, Devon, England, UK; at Powderham Castle
 Desden Room (room), aka Music Room, a chamber at the Home of Franklin D. Roosevelt National Historic Site
 Music Room (vault), a chamber in Asheville, North Carolina, USA; at the Biltmore Estate
 Music Room (closet), a chamber in Bath, England, UK; at the Herschel Museum of Astronomy
 Music Room (hall), a chamber in Lisbon, Portugal; at the Palace of Queluz
 Music Room (parlor), a chamber in Olean, New York, USA; at the Conklin Mountain House

See also

 
 Music rehearsal space
 
 
 Music (disambiguation)
 Room (disambiguation)
 Music from Another Room (disambiguation)
 Chamber music (disambiguation)